Vachellia tomentosa is a species of Vachellia originally described by Willd.

References

tomentosa